The 1976 United States presidential election in Wyoming took place on November 2, 1976, as part of the 1976 United States presidential election. Voters chose three representatives, or electors, to the Electoral College, who voted for president and vice president.

Wyoming was won by incumbent President Gerald Ford (R–Michigan), with 59.30% of the popular vote, against Jimmy Carter (D–Georgia), with 39.81% of the popular vote. Carter's vote would be the highest percent received by a Democrat since Lyndon Johnson's victory 1964, and, as of 2020, remains the highest percentage a Democrat has received in the period since then (Bill Clinton came closer to winning the state in terms of margin of victory in 1992 and 1996, though with a reduced percentage due to the strong third party candidacy of Ross Perot). 

Despite losing in Wyoming, Carter went on to win the national election and became the 39th president of the United States.

With 59.3 percent of the popular vote, Wyoming would prove to be Ford's third strongest state in the 1976 election after neighboring Utah and Idaho.

Results

Results by county

See also
 United States presidential elections in Wyoming

References

Wyoming
1976
1976 Wyoming elections